Dr. Emory Kempton Lindquist (Feb. 29, 1908 – Jan. 27, 1992) was the president of Bethany College (1943–1953) in Lindsborg, Kansas and Wichita State University in Wichita, Kansas (1963–1968). He also served as a professor and authored many articles and books, especially regarding Swedish-American history.

Early life
Emory K. Lindquist was born in Lindsborg, Kansas. He was the son of Harry Theodore Lindquist (1879–1938) and Augusta Amelia Peterson Lindquist (1885–1973) and was the grandson of Swedish immigrants. He graduated from Bethany College in 1930 and won a prestigious Rhodes Scholarship to University of Oxford in England where he received another bachelor's degree and a master's degree from Jesus College, Oxford and then returned to Bethany to teach in 1933. Lindquist received his Ph.D. from the University of Colorado in 1941. In 1942 Lindquist married Irma Winifred Eleanor (Lann) Lindquist (1909–2007), an alumna of Bethany and a nurse, whom he met at a college reunion.

Career
Lindquist served as President of Bethany College from 1943 to 1953. From 1953 to 1978 he served as professor at Wichita State University. During this period he also served as a Dean and then President of Wichita State University from 1963 to 1968. While president, Lindquist was a member of the Urban League board and added African American staff and faculty to the university. Lindquist continued writing into his retirement and died in 1992 and was buried in the Smoky Hill Cemetery.

Honors
Knighted by King Carl XVI Gustaf of Sweden and received the Order of the North Star in 1976
Carl Sandburg Medal from the Swedish-American Historical Society in 1987
Great Swedish Heritage Award from the Swedish Council of America in 1990
Lindquist Hall in the Wallerstedt Library at Bethany College, and the Emory Lindquist Honors Program at Wichita State are named in Lindquist's honor.

Selected works
Smoky Valley People: A History of Lindsborg, Kansas (1953)
The Protestant church in Kansas: an annotated bibliography (1956)
Vision for a valley: Olof Olsson and the early history of Lindsborg (1970)
An immigrant's American odyssey: a biography of Ernst Skarstedt (1970)
An immigrant's two worlds: a biography of Hjalmar Edgren (1972)
Bethany in Kansas: the history of a college (1975)
Hagbard Brase: beloved music master (1985)
''Birger Sandzén, An Illustrated Biography (1993)

See also 

 Birger Sandzén
 Ernst Skarstedt
 Hjalmar Edgren
 Olof Olsson

References

External links
Papers of Emory Lindquist at WSU

American people of Swedish descent
University of Colorado alumni
Bethany College (Kansas) alumni
Presidents of Wichita State University
American Rhodes Scholars
1908 births
1992 deaths
Alumni of Jesus College, Oxford
20th-century American historians
American male non-fiction writers
People from Lindsborg, Kansas
20th-century American male writers
20th-century American academics